Nowy wspaniały świat (English: The New Magnificent World) is the debut studio album by Polish group 2 Plus 1, released in 1972 by Polskie Nagrania Muza. It contained some of the band's greatest hits: "Chodź, pomaluj mój świat", "Czerwone słoneczko", "Hej dogonię lato" and "Wstawaj szkoda dnia". The album turned out a huge commercial success and was certified Gold in Poland for selling in over 150,000 copies. It was re-released on CD twice: in 1995, with a slightly altered cover and 5 bonus tracks, and in 2001, retaining the original cover and standard track listing.

Track listing 
Side A:
 "Czerwone słoneczko" ("The Red Sun") – 2:48
 "Nowy wspaniały świat" ("The New Magnificent World") – 2:45
 "Pani moich godzin" ("The Lady of My Hours") – 3:18
 "Zielona droga" ("On the Green Road") – 3:03
 "W kamień zaklęci" ("Turned to Stone") – 2:17
 "Kiedy rzeką płynie kra" ("When Ice Floats Down the River") – 0:56
 "Gwiazdo wód" ("Star of Waters") – 3:33

Side B:
 "Hej dogonię lato" ("I'll Catch the Summer") – 3:13
 "Wstawaj szkoda dnia" ("Wake Up, Don't Waste the Day") – 2:55
 "Chodź, pomaluj mój świat" ("Come On, Paint My World") – 3:00
 "Jasny, biały dzień" ("Bright Day, White Day") – 3:05
 "Po jedwabnej stronie" ("On the Silk Side") – 3:42
 "Wrócimy tam któregoś ranka" ("We'll Get Back There Some Day") – 3:12

Bonus tracks (1995 CD reissue):
 "Codzienność" – 3:17
 "Panna radosna" – 2:11
 "Śpij, baju baju" – 2:52
 "Już nie będę taki głupi" – 2:32
 "Nie zmogła go kula" – 1:58

References

External links 
 Nowy wspaniały świat on Discogs

1972 debut albums
2 Plus 1 albums
Polish-language albums